Sõmeru Parish was a rural municipality of Estonia, in Lääne-Viru County. It had a population of 3,885 (2006) and an area of 168.29 km².

Settlements
Sõmeru Parish had 3 small boroughs, Näpi, Sõmeru and Uhtna and 28 villages: Aluvere, Andja, Aresi, Jäätma, Kaarli, Katela, Katku, Kohala, Kohala-Eesküla, Koovälja, Muru, Nurme, Papiaru, Rahkla, Raudlepa, Raudvere, Roodevälja, Rägavere, Sooaluse, Sämi, Sämi-Tagaküla, Toomla, Ubja, Ussimäe, Vaeküla, Varudi-Altküla, Varudi-Vanaküla, Võhma.

People
Sõmeru Parish is the birthplace of artist Endel Ruberg (1917–1989).

References

This article includes content from the Estonian Wikipedia article Sõmeru vald.

External links